Patrick Mason may refer to:
 Patrick Mason (theatre director), British theatre director
 Patrick Mason (economist), American economist
 Patrick Q. Mason, American historian
 Pat Mason, American college baseball coach

See also
 Mason Patrick, United States Army general